"Mortal coil" is a poetic term for the troubles of daily life and the strife and suffering of the world. It is used in the sense of a burden to be carried or abandoned. To "shuffle off this mortal coil" is to die, exemplified in the "To be, or not to be" soliloquy in Shakespeare's Hamlet.

Derivation
Derived from 16th-century English, "coil" refers to tumults or troubles. Used idiomatically, the phrase means "the bustle and turmoil of this mortal life". "Coil" has an unusual etymological history. It was coined repeatedly; at various times people have used it as a verb to mean "to cull", "to thrash", "to lie in rings or spirals", "to turn", "to mound hay" and "to stir". As a noun it has meant "a selection", "a spiral", "the breech of a gun", "a mound of hay", "a pen for hens", and "noisy disturbance, fuss, ado". It is in this last sense, which became popular in the 16th century, that Shakespeare used the word.

"Mortal coil"—along with "the slings and arrows of outrageous fortune", "to sleep, perchance to dream" and "ay, there’s the rub"—is part of Hamlet’s famous "To be, or not to be" speech.

Schopenhauer's speculation
Arthur Schopenhauer, in his Parerga and Paralipomena which was written in German, Volume 2, § 232a, conjectured that this phrase might have been involved in a typesetter's error or a slip of the author's pen.Should there not have been originally 'shuttled off'? This verb itself no longer exists but 'shuttle' is an implement used in weaving. Accordingly, the meaning might be: 'when we have unwound and worked off this coil of mortality.' In this way, the length of our life is metaphorically the length of thread that is coiled on a spool, a metaphor related to the ancient Greek mythological figures of the Fates. As humans live, the thread is unwound from the coil by the shuttle of the loom of time.

However, there are no other references in the speech to thread, looms, or weaving, and the remaining content of the speech matches the usage of coil, coile, or coyle to mean turmoil.

See also
 Vale of tears

References

Shakespearean phrases
Hamlet